M7 motorway may refer to:

 M7 motorway (Ireland), a motorway in Ireland
 M7 motorway (Hungary), a motorway in Hungary
 M-7 motorway (Pakistan), a motorway in Pakistan
 M7 highway (Russia), a highway in Russia, also known as the Volga Highway
 Westlink M7, a motorway in Australia